The canton of Cossé-le-Vivien is an administrative division of the Mayenne department, northwestern France. Its borders were modified at the French canton reorganisation which came into effect in March 2015. Its seat is in Cossé-le-Vivien.

It consists of the following communes:
 
Astillé
Athée
Ballots
La Boissière
Brains-sur-les-Marches
La Chapelle-Craonnaise
Congrier
Cosmes
Cossé-le-Vivien
Courbeveille
Cuillé
Fontaine-Couverte
Gastines
Laubrières
Livré-la-Touche
Méral
Quelaines-Saint-Gault
Renazé
La Roë
La Rouaudière
Saint-Aignan-sur-Roë
Saint-Erblon
Saint-Martin-du-Limet
Saint-Michel-de-la-Roë
Saint-Poix
Saint-Saturnin-du-Limet
La Selle-Craonnaise
Senonnes
Simplé

References

Cantons of Mayenne